Escolastico Calvo was a Panamanian journalist and editor. He was an editor of the Panamanian newspaper La Hora when he was shot by politician Aquilino Boyd after running a scathing editorial. Under Manuel Noriega, he managed government controlled media. After the United States invasion of Panama, he was detained by U.S. forces.

See also
The Panama Deception

References

Panamanian journalists
Male journalists